The Federal Alcohol Administration was a United States government agency created in 1935 (as part of the Department of the Treasury) by the Federal Alcohol Administration Act, title 27 chapter 8 of the United States Code. It was created to regulate the alcohol industry after the repeal of Prohibition, replacing a previous body (the Federal Alcohol Control Administration) which did not have statutory powers. The Act still partly continues in force, underpinning the powers of the Alcohol and Tobacco Tax and Trade Bureau (TTB).

See also
Bureau of Alcohol, Tobacco, Firearms, and Explosives (ATF)
Joseph H. Choate, Jr., head of the preceding Federal Alcohol Control Administration

External links
Federal Alcohol Administration Act, from the Cornell University Legal Information Institute
ATF History accessed Feb 7 2010

Government agencies established in 1935
Alcohol Administration
Alcohol Administration